Perittia sibirica is a moth of the family Elachistidae. It is found in Russia (Irkutsk and the southern Ural Mountains).

The larvae feed on Lonicera tatarica.

References

External links
lepiforum.de

Moths described in 1992
Elachistidae
Moths of Asia
Moths of Europe